Kristina Tollefsen is a Norwegian ski-orienteering competitor. 

She won a silver medal in the relay event at the 1990 World Ski Orienteering Championships in Sweden, together with Anne Svingheim and Ragnhild Bratberg. She placed 12th in the classic distance, and 14th in the short distance.

References

Year of birth missing (living people)
Living people
Norwegian orienteers
Female orienteers
Ski-orienteers
20th-century Norwegian women